The 2015–16 Lehigh Mountain Hawks women's basketball team represented Lehigh University during the 2015–16 NCAA Division I women's basketball season. The Mountain Hawks, led by twenty-first year head coach Sue Troyan, played their home games at Stabler Arena and are members of the Patriot League. They finished the season 18–13, 10–8 in Patriot League play to finish in a tie for fourth place. They advanced to the semifinals of the Patriot League women's tournament where they lost to Army.

Roster

Schedule

|-
!colspan=9 style="background:#502D0E; color:#FFFFFF;"| Non-conference regular season

|-
!colspan=9 style="background:#502D0E; color:#FFFFFF;"| Patriot League regular season

|-
!colspan=9 style="background:#502D0E; color:#FFFFFF;"| Patriot League Women's Tournament

See also
2015–16 Lehigh Mountain Hawks men's basketball team

References

Lehigh
Lehigh Mountain Hawks women's basketball seasons
Lehigh
Lehigh